Gordon Peter "Pete" Sears (born March 14, 1947) is an American retired ice hockey player and educator who played for the American national team. He won a silver medal at the 1972 Winter Olympics.

Early life and education
Sears was born and raised in Lake Placid, New York. He graduated from the State University of New York at Oswego, where he played on the hockey team.

Career 
In 1968, Sears tried out for the  United States men's national ice hockey team, but the goalie selection had already been completed. Sears was drafted in the United States Army and served two years in 1967–69, including a tour of duty in Vietnam during the Vietnam War. 

After graduating from college, Sears tried out for the United States men's national ice hockey team. He was selected as a backup for goaltender for Mike Curran. As a part of the team, he won a silver medal at the 1972 Winter Olympics. Sears played minor league hockey before taking a teaching position at Oswego High School. He remained at Oswego High School for 33 years, teaching history and working as the assistant and head coach of the school's hockey team.

References

1947 births
American men's ice hockey goaltenders
United States Army personnel of the Vietnam War
Columbus Owls players
Ice hockey players from New York (state)
Ice hockey players at the 1972 Winter Olympics
Living people
Medalists at the 1972 Winter Olympics
Olympic silver medalists for the United States in ice hockey
People from Lake Placid, New York
Suncoast Suns (SHL) players
United States Army soldiers

State University of New York at Oswego alumni